The 2016 season was Djurgårdens IF's 116th in existence, their 61st season in Allsvenskan and their 16th consecutive season in the league. They finished the season in 7th position, whilst being knocked out of the 2015–16 Svenska Cupen at the group stage, and progressing to the group stage of the 2016–17 Svenska Cupen.

Squad

Out on loan

}

Transfers

Winter

In:

Out:

Summer

In:

Out:

Competitions

Allsvenskan

Results summary

Results by round

Results

League table

2015–16 Svenska Cupen

Group stage

2016–17 Svenska Cupen

Group Stage took place during the 2017 season.

Squad statistics

Appearances and goals

|-
|colspan="14"|Players away from Djurgårdens on loan:
|-
|colspan="14"|Players who left Djurgårdens during the season:

|}

Goal scorers

Disciplinary record

References

External links
Official Website

Djurgårdens IF Fotboll seasons
Djurgårdens IF